Williamsburg Maternity Hospital was a Brooklyn hospital that had its birth announcements regularly covered. It was located at 753 Bushwick Avenue, and began in 1918. It closed more than once (and reopened) in the late 1920s/early 1930s. Williamsburg Maternity Hospital was listed in the 1930 census and was still operating in the 1950s.

References

  

Defunct hospitals in Brooklyn
Hospitals established in 1918
Maternity hospitals in the United States
History of women in New York City
Women in New York City